Malcolmson is a surname. Notable people with the surname include:

 John Malcolmson VC MVO (1835–1902), Scottish officer in the Bengal army, Recipient of the Victoria Cross
 Mary Malcolmson, started the first Girl Guide company in Canada
 Paula Malcomson, Irish Actress
 Sam Malcolmson, Scottish Footballer

See also
Malcomson